Suruceni Stadium is a stadium in Suruceni, Moldova.  It is currently used mostly for football matches and serves as the home for FC Sfintul Gheorghe of the Moldovan National Division.  The stadium has a capacity of 1,500 spectators.

References

External links
Stadium information

Football venues in Moldova
FC Sfîntul Gheorghe